Karin Elisabeth Rådström (born 22 February 1979) is a Swedish engineer and business executive in the commercial vehicle segment. She has been a member of the Board of Management of Daimler Truck since February 2021 and has been responsible for the Mercedes-Benz truck brand there since May.

Career
Rådström was born in Södertälje and grew up in Nynäshamn and for seven years in Toronto, Ontario, Canada. She first studied at Queen's University at Kingston for a year and then as a civil engineer in Industrial Engineering and Sustainability at the KTH Royal Institute of Technology in Stockholm and then became a trainee at Scania in Södertälje in 2004. After various positions in the company, she became Director of Pre Sales & Marketing Communication in Kenya and in 2016, head of Scania Bus Business. In 2019, Radström was appointed to the Board of Management for Sales and Marketing. 

In 2021, she became a member of Daimler Truck AG's management team (Vorstandsmitglied der Daimler Truck AG) of seven people, with responsibility for the regions of Europe and Latin America and for Daimler's Mercedes-Benz trucks.

Personal life
During the latter part of the 2000s, Rådström was an elite athlete in rowing, with three years in the national team. She is married to Daniel Rådström and has two children.

References

1979 births
Living people
People from Södertälje
Women corporate executives
Mercedes-Benz Group executives
Scania AB people
21st-century Swedish businesswomen
21st-century Swedish businesspeople
Swedish women business executives
Swedish women engineers
Queen's University at Kingston alumni
KTH Royal Institute of Technology alumni